Linda Frías Zelaya (born 14 April 1997) is a US-born Mexican–Salvadoran footballer who plays as a forward for the El Salvador women's national team.

Early life
Frías was born and raised in Southern California, having lived in Anaheim, to a Mexican father and a Salvadoran mother.

High school and college career
Frías' high school and college career was entirely in California. She has attended the Orange High School in Orange, the Bethesda University in Anaheim and the Santa Ana College in Santa Ana.

Club career
Frías has played for Alianza FC in El Salvador, whom she joined in 2019, and for Santos Laguna in Mexico.

International career
Frías made her senior debut for El Salvador on 8 April 2021.

See also
List of El Salvador women's international footballers

References

External links
 Linda Frias at Bethesda University
 

1997 births
Living people
Citizens of El Salvador through descent
Salvadoran women's footballers
Women's association football forwards
Alianza F.C. footballers
El Salvador women's international footballers
Salvadoran people of Mexican descent
Citizens of Mexico through descent
Mexican women's footballers
Santos Laguna (women) players
Liga MX Femenil players
Mexican people of Salvadoran descent
Soccer players from Anaheim, California
American women's soccer players
College women's soccer players in the United States
American sportspeople of Mexican descent
American sportspeople of Salvadoran descent